Patrick Carter (born February 6, 1985) is a former American football wide receiver. He was signed by the Baltimore Ravens as an undrafted free agent in 2008. He played college football at Louisville.

Carter has also been a member of the Tampa Bay Buccaneers, Seattle Seahawks, Denver Broncos, Hartford Colonials and Miami Dolphins. 

He is the younger brother of former New York Giants wide receiver Tim Carter and his cousin, Stan Wilcox, is the NCAA Executive Vice President of Regulatory Affairs.

Early life
Patrick, like his older brother Tim, had a stellar high school career, and was selected as an Academic All-American at the University of Louisville.  Patrick had many notable achievements in football, track & field, and basketball.  Patrick graduated from Lakewood High School (Florida) in 2003, a school known for tremendously talented alumni such as Ernest Givins, Tom Carter (American football), Tim Carter (American football), Louis Murphy, Dante Fowler, Rashod Moulton, Aveion Cason, Cornell Green (offensive tackle), Jonte Green, Rose Richmond, Shaquill Griffin, Shaquem Griffin  He was elected to 2003 East/West All Star game, but declined so another player/friend could get exposure.  Patrick graduated from high school with 50 college athletic scholarship offers.

In addition to athletics, Patrick was very involved in his community.  He was a member of Young Life and http://www.atlantahabitat.org.  It was through Young Life and personal friendships Patrick sought to teach others about being both a Christian and an outstanding athlete.

Track 

As a senior, Patrick won state in track & field in the 4 × 100 meters relay, setting a high school record. Patrick also qualified in the 100 meters with a 10.54s time.

Basketball 

As a junior, he was the 6th man on the State Champion Lakewood High School team, with a record of 33-2. Patrick won the 6th man Award, and broke the state record for blocked shots.

Football 

Patrick set seven Lakewood High School records as quarterback, including number of completions, total yards in a season, highest completion percentage, total touchdowns, total yards in a game, highest average yards per game, and tied the quarterback sneak record for longest rush (99 yards).  As a senior, he was ranked 12th in the nation as a dual-threat quarterback.

College Career
Patrick decided to attend Georgia Tech, primarily to be closer to his oldest brother.  During his college career, Patrick played four out of five years as quarterback. In 2004, he played backup quarterback to Reggie Ball. During that same year, he also qualified for the indoor 60 metres in track & field. He also went to the ACC Indoor Championship.

In 2005, Carter transferred to Louisville, which meant he had to sit out of athletics for the year. Instead of playing, he logged over 1,000+ hours with Habitat for Humanity and made many visits to children's hospitals.

In 2006, Carter resumed playing as a wide receiver, and started along with Harry Douglas, Gary Barnidge, Michael Bush, Brian Brohm, Breno Giacomini, Mario Urrutia and Bilial Powell. During this season, Carter averaged 5.9 yards per punt return, caught 5 passes for 68 yards, and 17 punt returns for 117 yards. He was listed as the fastest player on the team consistently posting 4.2s and 4.3s 40 yard dashes. When Brohm became injured, Carter was moved to quarterback. In the Orange Bowl that year, he threw the first touchdown pass (1st in Louisville BCS history) to running back Anthony Allen.

While at Louisville, Carter also set track & field records for 55 metres, 60 metres, and 200 metres dashes. During his senior year, he helped lead his team to win the Big East Track & Field Outdoor Championship.

NFL Career
In 2007, Carter entered the NFL Draft, and was signed as a Baltimore Ravens free agent. In 2008, Carter signed by the Tampa Bay Buccaneers, and played on the practice squad for the season. In 2009, Carter signed with the Seattle Seahawks and later traded to the Miami Dolphins where played for two seasons before joining the CFL Toronto Argonauts, retiring in 2012.

While in Baltimore, Patrick Carter was able to learn under the tutelage of Cam Cameron, who also mentored the likes of Jim Harbaugh, Amani Toomer and Heisman Trophy Winner Desmond Howard. 

During his tenure with the Dolphins where he played wide receiver, quarterback and defensive back, Carter was taught about preparing game plans with Offensive Coordinator Brian Daboll and worked under the supervision of Ike Hilliard, who was the assistant wide receivers coach at the time. Carter was also able to understand player development and how to expand the passing game based on a player's skills, learning from Karl Dorrell, who spent time as the Dolphins wide receivers coach (2008-2010) and quarterbacks coach (2011).

In Toronto, Carter was exposed to different ways of attacking coverages because of the differences in rules between the NFL and CFL such as what can be executed within the timing of the quarterback's play and the capabilities of the offensive line. This experience allows Carter to game plan differently.

Post NFL Career
Patrick Carter became the co-owner of Carter's Express, Inc. in 2011. The company contracted for FedEx and operated 20 trucks for home ground delivery. Carter sold the company in 2018 to join his wife, Brittney Carter, as a joint owner of Life's Purpose, serving over 500 youth since its inception in September 2019, with the support of the community and various non-profit organizations.

Carter also works to help train young athletes, specifically defensive backs and wide receivers, who have dreams to get football scholarships and has a success rate of 100%. Patrick has worked with, and are not limited to   Parker Washington, a standout wide receiver at Penn State, Jamal Morris, a linebacker who began his career at  Oklahoma before transferring to Houston, Auburn Quarterback, Dematrius Davis, Draylan Ellis of Austin Peay, Dylan Robinson of Houston, Reggie Brown of Tulane, Ralpheal Marshall of Louisiana Tech, Jackson Reese of Southwestern, Demetrius Davis of Auburn, Victor Garza of Tufts, Ben Montgomery of Dartmouth, Cam Peters of UTSA, Dylan Dixon of Houston, Caleb Crawford and Matthew Burger of Trinity, Bryce Ramierez of Texas Tech, Jaylon Coleman of Houston Baptist,Josh Williams of LSU, Dru Polidore of Air Force, Bayne Tryon of Tulsa, Mannie Nunnery of Houston, and Drake Dabney of Baylor. 

He also works with Georgia commit Dillon Bell and his brother, Micah Bell, who is a four star recruit, as well as Jeffrey Ugo, a 3 three star recruit.

He currently is a part time defensive backs coach at Kinkaid High School in Houston, Texas. The football team has been in the championship each of the last five years, winning 4 (2017, 2018, 2020, and 2021).

External links
Louisville Cardinals football bio
Louisville Cardinals track & field bio
Seattle Seahawks bio
Just Sports Stats

1985 births
Living people
Players of American football from St. Petersburg, Florida
American football wide receivers
Georgia Tech Yellow Jackets football players
Louisville Cardinals football players
Baltimore Ravens players
Tampa Bay Buccaneers players
Seattle Seahawks players
Hartford Colonials players
Denver Broncos players
Miami Dolphins players